Miss Peregrine's Home for Peculiar Children is a 2016 fantasy film directed by Tim Burton and written by Jane Goldman, based on the 2011 novel of the same name by Ransom Riggs. The film stars Eva Green, Asa Butterfield, Chris O'Dowd, Allison Janney, Rupert Everett, Terence Stamp, Ella Purnell, Judi Dench, and Samuel L. Jackson.

Filming began in February 2015 in London and the Tampa Bay Area. The film premiered at Fantastic Fest in Austin, Texas, on September 25, 2016, and was theatrically released in the United States on September 30, 2016, by 20th Century Fox. It received mixed reviews, with praise for Burton's direction and visual atmosphere, but criticism for its plot, and grossed $296 million worldwide against a production budget of $110 million.

Plot

Abe Portman has told stories to his grandson Jake about battling monsters and spending his childhood at "Miss Peregrine's Home for Peculiar Children" at Cairnholm, an island off the coast of Wales. The home's children and headmistress, Miss Alma Peregrine, possess paranormal abilities and are known as "Peculiars". One day, Jake finds Abe dying with his eyes removed, and he tells Jake to go to "the loop of September 3, 1943".

Following advice from Dr. Golan, Jake travels to the United Kingdom to go to Cairnholm with his father Frank to investigate the children’s home. Jake discovers that it was destroyed during a Luftwaffe raid, but upon entering the ruins he finds the children from Abe's stories. They take him through a portal and he emerges in the year 1943 with the house still intact. Miss Peregrine explains that she belongs to a class of female Peculiars named Ymbryne who can transform into birds (in Miss Peregrine's case, a peregrine falcon) and manipulate time. To avoid persecution for being Peculiars, she and the children hide from the outside world in a time loop she created, set to September 3, 1943 and accessible only to Peculiar, which allows them to live the same day repeatedly and avoid aging as long as they stay inside it.

Jake is introduced to the rest of the children, including aerokinetic Emma Bloom, whom he likes. Jake learns he is also a Peculiar like his grandfather, and can see the invisible monsters from his stories, called "Hollowgasts" (or "Hollows"). They are disfigured Peculiar scientists who killed a Ymbryne in a failed experiment to harvest her powers in an attempt to achieve immortality. Led by shapeshifter Mr. Barron, they hunt Peculiars to consume their eyeballs, which allow them to regain visibly human form, but with milky-white eyes.

A wounded Ymbryne named Miss Avocet arrives, explaining that Barron assaulted her in the January 2016 time loop at Blackpool, England, killed her children, and is trying to repeat the failed experiment using more Ymbrynes. Jake returns to 2016, finds an elderly man has been killed by a Hollow, and goes back to the portal to warn them that the Hollow is near. He is followed by an ornithologist who is actually Mr. Barron.

Barron had tried to extract the location of Ms. Peregrine's loop from Abe, but his hungry Hollow companion, Mr. Malthus, killed Abe before he could do so. He then posed as Dr. Golan, encouraging Jake to go to the island so Jake could lead him to the loop. Using Jake as a hostage, Barron forces Miss Peregrine to trap herself in bird form and takes her to Blackpool, leaving Jake, the other children, and Miss Avocet as prey for Malthus.

Malthus kills Miss Avocet, and Jake and the children escape just as the Luftwaffe raid destroys the house, killing Malthus. Without Miss Peregrine to reset it, the loop closes, leaving them stuck in 1943. Salvaging a sunken ocean liner, RMS Augusta, that Emma has used as a personal hideout, they travel to Blackpool and enter its January 2016 loop. They fight and destroy Barron's Wight and Hollow allies, and rescue Miss Peregrine and other captive Ymbrynes. When the last remaining Hollow arrives, Jake sees and avoids it, and instead it kills Barron and is then in turn killed by Jake.

Jake says goodbye to the children in 1943 while he stays in 2016 and relates his adventures to Abe, who is alive and well as Barron's death in early 2016 has erased his presence in Florida later on. Abe gives Jake a map of international time loops, which Jakes takes, serves in World War II, and eventually reunites with his friends in 1943. Jake, Emma, Miss Peregrine and the children journey to seek a happy time loop.

Cast

Peculiars

Peculiar adults 
 Eva Green as Miss Alma LeFay Peregrine, the strict but clever and caring Ymbryne headmistress of Miss Peregrine's Home for Peculiar Children who can transform into a peregrine falcon and manipulate time
 Terence Stamp as Abe Portman, Jake's grandfather who can see the invisible Hollows
 Callum Wilson as young Abe
 Judi Dench as Miss Esmeralda Avocet, the Ymbryne headmistress of another shelter for Peculiar Children in Blackpool. Like Miss Peregrine, Miss Avocet can manipulate time; she can transform into an avocet.

Peculiar children 
 Asa Butterfield as Jake Portman, a 16-year-old American teenager and Abe's grandson. He visits Miss Peregrine's Home for Peculiar Children and is given, by Miss Peregrine, the task/promise of protecting the children. Like his grandfather, Jake has the ability to see the invisible Hollows.
 Butterfield also portrays Mr. Barron's disguise as Jake
Aiden Flowers as 10-year-old Jake
 Nicholas Oteri as 6-year-old Jake
 Ella Purnell as Emma Bloom, an aerokinetic teenager who can manipulate air and can breathe under water by creating liquid bubbles of air. She is lighter than air and must always wear lead shoes or a tether to keep from floating away. Emma is also Abe's former love interest in the 1940s and Jake's current love interest.
 Finlay MacMillan as Enoch O'Connor, a teenager and Olive's love interest who can reanimate the dead and bring inanimate objects to life as his living puppets for a limited time by placing a heart inside
 Lauren McCrostie as Olive Abroholos Elephanta, a pyrokinetic red-haired teenager and Enoch's love interest. She has to wear special black gloves in order to prevent burning everything she touches. 
 Cameron King as the voice and motion-capture of Millard Nullings, an invisible boy
 Pixie Davies as Bronwyn Bruntley, a young girl with superhuman strength, Victor's sister
 Georgia Pemberton as Fiona Frauenfeld, a young girl who can control and maintain plants including the vegetables in Miss Peregrine's garden
 Milo Parker as Hugh Apiston, a boy with bees living in his stomach
 Raffiella Chapman as Claire Densmore, a young girl with an additional mouth hidden in the back of her head
 Hayden Keeler-Stone as Horace Somnusson, a boy who can project his dreams (which are sometimes prophetic) through a monocle
 Joseph and Thomas Odwell as the Twins, two masked gorgon-like twin boys who turn anyone who sees them into stone. They normally wear hoods to hide their faces.
 Louis Davison as Victor Bruntley, Bronwyn's late brother who had the same ability as her. He was killed by a hollow infiltrator prior to the events in the film, and was briefly brought back to life by Enoch.

Wights and Hollows  
 Samuel L. Jackson as Mr. Barron, the shapeshifting leader of the Wights and Hollows. Barron and his Wight and Hollow minions hunt Peculiars and devour their eyes to recover human form. Barron also believes by doing this that he is invincible. His shape-shifting peculiarity allows him to disguise himself as another person. When he uses his peculiarity to become a person who doesn't exist, his white eyes don't change, so he has to wear contact lenses. He can also form blades, axes and/or lassos with his own hands.
Allison Janney as Dr. Nancy Golan, Jake's psychiatrist and one of Mr. Barron's disguised forms
 Rupert Everett as John Lamont (credited as "Ornithologist"), an ornithologist and another of Mr. Barron's disguised forms
 Scott Handy as Mr. Gleeson, a cryokinetic Wight
 Helen Day as Miss Edwards, a half-simian Wight with a great agility, dexterity and mobility
 Jack Brady as Mr. Clark, a Wight
 Philip Philmar as Mr. Archer, a Wight
 Robert Milton Wallace as Mr. Malthus, a Hollow

Non-Peculiars
 Chris O'Dowd as Franklin "Frank" Portman, Jake's father and Abe's son
 Kim Dickens as Maryann Portman (credited as "Jake's Mom"), Jake's mother and an up-and-coming businesswoman
 O-Lan Jones as Shelly, Jake's drugstore supervisor and co-worker
 Jennifer Jarackas as Susie Portman, Frank's sister and Jake's aunt. She passes Jake her late father's gift which gives him the way to find Miss Peregrine's time loop.
 George Vricos as Bobby, Judy's husband and Jake's uncle
 Brooke Jaye Taylor as Judy, Bobby's wife and Jake's other aunt
 Ioan Hefin as Kev, the bartender on Cairnholm in the present day
 Nicholas Amer as Oggie, a blind and elderly present-day resident of Cairnholm
 Shaun Thomas and Justin Davies as Dylan and Worm, two present-day teenage Welsh residents whom Jake meets in Cairnholm

Director Tim Burton makes a cameo appearance in the film as a visitor at the fun fair in Blackpool who gets a skeleton thrown at him by a Hollow. Glen Mexted, who previously worked with Burton as an extra in both Dark Shadows and the music video for the Killers' "Here with Me", also appears in the same scene as a customer eating ice cream.

Production
The film rights to the 2011 novel Miss Peregrine's Home for Peculiar Children by Ransom Riggs were sold to 20th Century Fox in May of that year. In November, Deadline Hollywood reported that Tim Burton was in talks to direct and would also be involved in selecting a writer. On December 2, Jane Goldman was reportedly hired to adapt the story as a screenplay for the film.

On July 28, 2014, Eva Green was set to play Miss Peregrine in the film; Mischa Barton, Lucy Hale and Alison Sudol were also considered. On September 24, 2014, it was announced that Asa Butterfield was being eyed for the second lead role as Burton's choice, but that at that time he had not yet been offered the role. On November 5, 2014, Ella Purnell was offered a role and was in final talks to join the film; it was also reported that Butterfield had been offered the male lead role, and was the favored choice. On February 6, 2015, Samuel L. Jackson was added to the cast to play Mr. Barron, while Butterfield was confirmed for the second lead role. Terence Stamp, Chris O'Dowd, Rupert Everett, Kim Dickens, and Judi Dench were announced as being in the cast on March 12, 2015.

Filming was initially set to begin in August 2014 in London. Principal photography on the film began on February 24, 2015 in the Tampa Bay Area. Filming lasted for two weeks in Hillsborough and Pinellas counties in Florida. It is the second Tim Burton film to be shot in the Tampa Bay area, the first being Edward Scissorhands, in 1989. Production of the film later moved to Caerhays Castle and Minions in Cornwall, and Blackpool in the United Kingdom, and Brasschaat, a municipality close to Antwerp, Belgium. Filming also took place at Pinewood Studios.

Music
The film's score was composed by Mike Higham and Matthew Margeson. The soundtrack was released on October 11, 2016 by La-La Land Records and Fox Music. Florence and the Machine recorded the film's end credits song, "Wish That You Were Here".

Release
Miss Peregrine's Home for Peculiar Children was originally set for a release date of July 31, 2015. The release date moved to March 4, 2016, then again to December 25, 2016, before finally moving to September 30, 2016.

Reception

Box office
Miss Peregrine's Home for Peculiar Children grossed $87.2 million in the United States and Canada and $207.9 million in other territories for a worldwide total of $295.1 million, against a production budget of $110 million.

In the United States and Canada, the film opened alongside Deepwater Horizon and Masterminds as well as the wide expansion of Queen of Katwe, and was projected to gross around $25 million from 3,522 theaters in its opening weekend. In total, the film earned $28.9 million during its opening weekend, finishing first at the box office. The opening was on par with Dark Shadows''' $29.7 million in 2012, Burton's last big budgeted film. Variety called it "a mediocre start" given the film's $110 million budget.

It had number one openings in Russia ($6.3 million), France ($5.3 million), Mexico ($3.8 million), Australia ($3.1 million), Brazil ($2.7 million) and the Philippines ($1.7 million) and the biggest opening for Burton in Malaysia and Indonesia. In South Korea, it debuted at number two with $5.2 million. The film was released in China and Italy in December 2016 and Japan in February 2017.

Critical response
On Rotten Tomatoes, the film has an approval rating of 64% based on 259 reviews, with an average rating of 5.9/10. The website's critical consensus reads, "Miss Peregrine's Home for Peculiar Children proves a suitable match for Tim Burton's distinctive style, even if it's on stronger footing as a visual experience than a narrative one." On Metacritic, the film has a weighted average score of 57 out of 100 based on 43 critics, indicating "mixed or average reviews". Audiences polled by CinemaScore gave the film an average grade of "B+" on an A+ to F scale.

IGN critic Samantha Ladwig gave the film a 7.2/10, summarizing her review with: "Though there are lingering questions about certain characters by the time the end credits roll, the film's striking visuals help compensate for its unemotional and anti-climactic script." Justin Chang of Los Angeles Times wrote "Easily the director's finest work since his masterful 2007 screen adaptation of Sweeney Todd, and a striking reminder of what an unfettered gothic imagination can achieve with the right focus and an infusion of discipline." USA Todays Brian Truitt gave the film 3.5 out of 4 and wrote, "After a long run of dystopian YA movies for teen crowds, Burton is just the right guy to make cinema weird again." Calvin Wilson of St. Louis Post-Dispatch gave the film 3.5 out of 4 and stated, "Burton delivers his most ambitious and engaging film since Sweeney Todd (2007). Although the story becomes increasingly complex as it goes along, the emotional payoff is more than worth it."

Michael O'Sullivan of The Washington Post gave the film 3 out of 4 and wrote "The very idea of this – at once gruesome and darkly funny — is perfectly suited to Burton's sensibility, which also reveals itself in the casting of Butterfield, who has the quality of a young, slightly less freaky Johnny Depp." The Guardian's Jordan Hoffman gave the film 4 out of 5 and said, "We get the playfulness of seeing quirky magic powers mixed with the familiarity of how a time loop plays out. Add in Burton's authorial visual stamp and what we've got is an extremely pleasing formula. It gels as Tim Burton's best (non-musical) live-action movie for 20 years." James Berardinelli from ReelViews gave the film 3 out of 4 and stated, "Overall, despite feeling a little long and suffering from a rushed ending, Miss Peregrine's Home for Peculiar Children is a fresh and engaging storybook adventure that should appeal to viewers both inside and out of the core demographic." The New York Times&apos; Manohla Dargis gave a positive review, writing: "The story gets awfully busy — you may get lost in 1943 or perhaps closer to the present — but it scarcely matters. Mr. Burton's attention to detail and to the ebb and flow of tone (scary, funny, eerie), as well as his sensitive, gentle work particularly with the child actors, make each new turn another occasion for unfettered imagination." Devan Coggan from Entertainment Weekly gave the film "B−" (67/100), with describing the film "The film chooses style over substance, emphasizing how cool the children's powers are without fleshing them out as full characters. To compete with Burton's best, his heroic weirdos need a little more heart — and the monsters need sharper teeth."

Kyle Smith of the New York Post, Richard Roeper of the Chicago Sun-Times and Tom Huddleston of Time Out decried the film. According to Smith, who gave the film 2 stars out of 4: "It may be senseless, but it's sumptuous: the picture looks like it cost about a billion bucks, with absolutely every detail giving Burton an excuse to take his mad picture-book mind and let loose, the way Emma the girl full of air keeps soaring away from earthly constraints. Burton may give us a bland hero, a tepid love story and a muddled plot but, hey, at least he's got a skeleton army doing battle with giant tentacle monsters at an amusement park." Roeper, who scored the film 1.5 stars out of 4, began his review by writing: "I'm wondering if the mutant kids at Miss Peregrine's Home for Peculiar Children ever play basketball against their rivals across the pond, Xavier's School for Gifted Youngsters. I'd watch that. I'd certainly rather watch that than Tim Burton's adaptation of the popular children's book about a school for freakishly gifted children. This is a messy, confusing, uninvolving mishmash of old-school practical effects and CGI battles that feels ... off nearly every misstep of the way. Tom Huddleston of Time Out gave the film 2 stars out of 5, writing: "Director Tim Burton likes his films busy: watch a classic like Beetlejuice or Batman, and you'll be pushed to find a single frame that isn't packed with background detail, weird creatures, ornate furnishings and intricate costumes. The problem with his new film, Miss Peregrine's Home for Peculiar Children'', is that the script is every bit as busy and it can get pretty confusing."

Accolades

References

External links
 
 

2016 films
2016 3D films
2010s fantasy adventure films
2010s monster movies
American 3D films
American fantasy adventure films
British 3D films
British fantasy adventure films
American dark fantasy films
Films about children
Films about orphans
Films about shapeshifting
Films based on fantasy novels
Films scored by Matthew Margeson
Films set in 1943
Films set in 2006
Films set in 2010
Films set in 2016
Films set in Blackpool
Films set in California
Films set in country houses
Films set in Florida
Films set in London
Films set in Tokyo
Films set in Wales
Films shot in Belgium
Films shot in Florida
Films shot in London
Steampunk films
Films using motion capture
Time loop films
Films about time travel
20th Century Fox films
TSG Entertainment films
Films with screenplays by Jane Goldman
Films directed by Tim Burton
Films produced by Peter Chernin
American World War II films
British World War II films
Films about Nazis
Films set on fictional islands
Films based on American novels
Films set in England
Chernin Entertainment films
Films shot at Pinewood Studios
2010s English-language films
2010s American films
2010s British films